Caput succedaneum is a neonatal condition involving a serosanguinous, subcutaneous, extraperiosteal fluid collection with poorly defined margins caused by the pressure of the presenting part of the scalp against the dilating cervix (tourniquet effect of the cervix) during delivery.

It involves bleeding below the scalp and above the periosteum.

See also
 Cephalohematoma
 Cephalic
 Chignon (medical term)
 Hematoma
 Subgaleal hemorrhage

References

External links 

Birth trauma
Vascular-related cutaneous conditions